Hypomachilodes is a genus of rock bristletail in the family Meinertellidae. There are at least two described species in Hypomachilodes.

Species
These two species belong to the genus Hypomachilodes:
 Hypomachilodes forthaysi Packauskas & Shofner, 2010
 Hypomachilodes texanus Silvestri, 1911

References

Further reading

 
 
 
 

Archaeognatha
Articles created by Qbugbot